Martín Werner Wainfeld is a Mexican businessman and a director of Grupo Aeroportuario Centro Norte, S.A.B. de C.V. He was previously co-head of investment banking in Latin America at Goldman Sachs.

Early life and education
Werner has a bachelor's degree from the Instituto Tecnológico Autónomo de México and a Ph.D. in economics from Yale University.

Career
In 1994, Werner was appointed assistant director of telecommunications in Mexico's Zedillo administration. During the Mexican peso crisis, the Ministry of Finance hired Werner as under-secretary to assist with the economic recovery. Werner joined Goldman Sachs in 2000 and became co-head of its investment banking business in Latin America.

In 2016, Werner left Goldman and co-founded DD3 Capital Partners.

References

Argentine investment bankers
Argentine Jews
Living people
Goldman Sachs people
Israeli investment bankers
Israeli Jews
Mexican Jews
Year of birth missing (living people)